Monthly Classy Magazine is a Japanese women's magazine. Its title, Classy, is derived from the English adjective classy. 
It is estimated that the average reader of Classy magazine is between the age of 24 and 28. The magazine is known to be popular with office ladies (widely known as OL in Japan). It is also famous among university students as a magazine for  fashion.

History
Classy was first published in 1984. The magazine is published by Kobunsha.

The magazine targets women in their 20s. It is a sister magazine of JJ, and has been published since 1984 by the same company. The two magazines are closely linked, and often, models who posed for JJ magazine in their youth will return a few years later to model for Classy.

Models
In the beginning, most of the models were American supermodels, however changes in the policy led to the inclusion of more and more local models. Famous Japanese supermodels, namely  and  started their modeling careers by appearing as cover girls in the magazine.

Several well-known models are working for the magazine. Hiroko Hatano, who used to work for JJ magazine, started to work as a model here in 2005. Jessica Michibata, Sayo Aizawa and Ryoko Tanami are also popular.

References

External links
  - Publishers website (in Japanese)

1984 establishments in Japan
Classy
Kobunsha
Magazines established in 1984
Magazines published in Tokyo
Monthly magazines published in Japan
Classy
Classy